Mount Gibson may refer to:
 Mount Gibson, Western Australia, located in the mid-west region of Western Australia
 Mount Gibson Sanctuary, a large nature reserve in Western Australia
 Mount Gibson, Antarctica, in the Prince Charles Mountains of Antarctica
 Mount Gibson Iron, mining company operating the mine on Koolan Island, WA